Jeffrey Halliburton (born July 3, 1949) is an American former basketball player who played in the National Basketball Association (NBA) for two seasons. He is the cousin of Basketball Hall of Famer Julius Erving.

College career

Halliburton, a 6'5" guard, transferred to Drake University from San Jacinto Junior College and played for the Bulldogs for two seasons from 1969 to 1971.  He led the Bulldogs to consecutive NCAA Tournament Regional Final appearances in 1970 and 1971.  He was named first team All-Missouri Valley Conference both seasons at Drake, and was named MVC Player of the Year and an honorable mention All-American as a senior.

Professional career

Halliburton was drafted in the third round of the 1971 NBA Draft (39th pick overall) by the Atlanta Hawks.  He played the 1971–72 season with the Hawks, averaging 4.0 points and 1.0 rebounds off the bench.  He started the 1972–73 season with the Hawks, but was traded to the Philadelphia 76ers, where he averaged 9.5 points per game for the remainder of the season.

He played for the Iberia Superstars of the European Professional Basketball League in 1975.

References

1949 births
Living people
American expatriate basketball people in Spain
American men's basketball players
Atlanta Hawks draft picks
Atlanta Hawks players
Basketball players from New York (state)
Drake Bulldogs men's basketball players
Malverne High School alumni
People from Rockville Centre, New York
Philadelphia 76ers players
San Jacinto Central Ravens men's basketball players
Shooting guards
Sportspeople from Nassau County, New York